Anchela Rohof (born 26 February 1955) is a Dutch equestrian. She competed in two events at the 1992 Summer Olympics.

References

1955 births
Living people
Dutch female equestrians
Olympic equestrians of the Netherlands
Equestrians at the 1992 Summer Olympics
Sportspeople from Overijssel
20th-century Dutch women
20th-century Dutch people